Affala is a village and rural commune in Niger. It is in the Department of Tahoua.

References

Communes of Niger